is a monorail station on the Chiba Urban Monorail located in Inage-ku in the city of Chiba, Chiba Prefecture, Japan. It is located 2.5 kilometers from the northern terminus of the line at Chiba Station.

Lines
 Chiba Urban Monorail Line 2

Layout
Tendai Station is an elevated station with two opposed side platforms serving two tracks.

Platforms

History
Tendai Station opened on June 12, 1991.

See also
 List of railway stations in Japan

External links

Chiba Urban Monorail website 

Railway stations in Chiba Prefecture
Railway stations in Japan opened in 1991
Railway stations in Chiba (city)